LZR may refer to:

 Lzr - a variant of the Stoned computer virus
 LZR (Lempel - Ziv - Renau) - a lossless data compression algorithm
  LZR - the ICAO airline code for the Bulgarian airline Air Lazur
  LZR - the International Air Transport Association airport code for Lizard Island Airport in Australia
 LZR Racer - a high-end Speedo swimsuit
 Led Zeppelin Remasters - a compilation album of remastered material by rock group Led Zeppelin